A Qareen ( qarīn, Urdu: ہمزاد literally meaning: 'constant companion') is a spiritual double of human, either part of the human himself or a complementary creature in a parallel dimension. Due to its ghostly nature, the Qareen is classified among the Jinn-type creatures, although usually not actually a Jinni. The Qareen as an accompanying spirit should not be confused with the Qarinah, a female "childbed demon" in Middle Eastern traditions.

Qareen in Islam

Qareen are mentioned by name in the following Quran verses:

Sūrat az-Zukhruf:
"And whosoever turns away from remembering and mentioning the Most Beneficent, we appoint for him a Satan to be a Qareen  to him."

Sūrat as-Saffat:
"A speaker among them will say, 'Indeed, I had a Qareen.'" 

Sūrat an-Nisa:
"And those who spend of their wealth to be seen by the people and believe not in Allah nor in the Last Day. And he to whom Satan is a Qareen - then evil is he as a Qareen."

Sūrat Qaf:
"And his Qareen, will say, 'This is what is with me, prepared.'" 

Several opinions exist on the exact nature of the Qareen. According to one opinion, the Qareen  is actually a Shaitan, who incites a human with waswās ("evil suggestions"), but can become good in accordance with the human’s good deeds. However it is uncertain whether or not a Qareen besides that of Muhammad can actually become good.

Another opinion holds that Qareen refers to any type of spirit accompanying humans. Here, the Qareen  refers to demons, who cast evil suggestions, but also to angels, who advise to do good deeds.

Further the Qareen is depicted as the other self: an integral spirit that is part of the person. A dissent between the inner Qareen and the behavior may cause the same symptoms as Jinn-possession.

Other sources 
The concept of a Qareen appears in pre-Islamic literature as well, and is reminiscent of the Greek daimones and the Christian guardian angel. In Pre-Islamic Arabian the Qareen is said to be able to inspire poets for their works.

One of the seven mu'allaqat—Arabic poems recognized as masterpieces during the pre-Islamic period—uses the word as a metaphor. To describe his tribe's excellence in battle, poet Amr bin Kulthum says that "every tribe has taken fear of us as a qarin (or 'constant companion')," meaning that their fear of Amr's tribe is always present. This goes further to show the origin of the word qareen, as described in the Arabic dictionary as a "companion".

See also
 Angel
 Bicameral mentality
 Dmuta in Mandaeism
 Doppelgänger
 Etiäinen
 Familiar spirit
 Genii
 Jinn
 Shadow (psychology)
 Tulpa
 Winged genie

References

Arabian legendary creatures
Arabian mythology
Arabic words and phrases
Demons in Islam
Quranic figures
Counterparts